The 2009 Chicago Cubs season was the 138th season of the Chicago Cubs franchise, the 134th in the National League and the 94th at Wrigley Field. The Cubs, attempting to win the NL Central division for the third consecutive season, fell short by finishing in second place with a record of 83–78.

Minor League affiliates
In 2009 The Chicago Cubs had three minor league affiliates. The team's Single-A affiliate is the Peoria Chiefs, located in Peoria. The Chicago Cubs' Double-A affiliate is the Tennessee Smokies based in the Knoxville, Tennessee metropolitan area. Finally the Chicago Cubs Triple-A Affiliate is the Iowa Cubs, located in Iowa. The Iowa Cubs are coached by former Cub and Hall of Fame player Ryne Sandberg In 2010. Sandberg previously coached the Chiefs and Smokies as well.

Regular season

Season standings

Record vs. opponents

Game log 

|- bgcolor="ffbbbb"
|- align="center" bgcolor="bbffbb"
| 1 || April 6 || @ Astros || 4–2 || Zambrano (1–0) || Oswalt (0–1) || Gregg (1) || 43,827 || 1–0
|- align="center" bgcolor="ffbbbb"
| 2 || April 7 || @ Astros || 3 – 2 (10) || Brocail (1–0) || Cotts (0–1) || || 31,121 || 1–1
|- align="center" bgcolor="bbffbb"
| 3 || April 8 || @ Astros || 11–6 || Lilly (1–0) || Moehler (0–1) || || 30,047 || 2–1
|- align="center" bgcolor="ffbbbb"
| 4 || April 10 || @ Brewers || 4–3 || Villanueva (1–0) || Gregg (0–1) || || 45,455 || 2–2
|- align="center" bgcolor="bbffbb"
| 5 || April 11 || @ Brewers || 6–5 || Heilman (1–0) || Villanueva (1–1) || Mármol (1) || 43,768 || 3–2
|- align="center" bgcolor="bbffbb"
| 6 || April 12 || @ Brewers || 8–5 || Dempster (1–0) || Suppan (0–2) || || 40,168 || 4–2
|- align="center" bgcolor="bbffbb"
| 7 || April 13 || Rockies || 4–0 || Lilly (2–0) || Jiménez (1–1) || || 40,077 || 5–2
|- align="center" bgcolor="ffbbbb"
| 8 || April 15 || Rockies || 5–2 || Marquis (2–0) || Harden (0–1) || Grilli (1) || 39,361 || 5–3
|- align="center" bgcolor="ffbbbb"
| 9 || April 16 || Cardinals || 7–4 || Wainwright (2–0) || Patton (0–1) || Franklin (2) || 38,909 || 5–4
|- align="center" bgcolor="bbffbb"
| 10 || April 17 || Cardinals || 8–7 || Heilman (2–0) || Pérez (0–1) || Mármol (2) || 40,250 || 6–4
|- align="center" bgcolor="bbffbb"
| 11 || April 18 || Cardinals || 7 – 5 (11) || Guzmán (1–0) || Reyes (0–1) || || 40,878 || 7–4
|- align="center" bgcolor="bbbbbb"
| || April 19 || Cardinals || colspan=6 | Postponed (rain) – rescheduled for July 12
|- align="center" bgcolor="bbffbb"
| 12 || April 21 || Reds || 7–2 || Harden (1–1) || Owings (0–2) || || 38,403 || 8–4
|- align="center" bgcolor="ffbbbb"
| 13 || April 22 || Reds || 3–0 || Cueto (1–1) || Lilly (2–1) || Cordero (6) || 38,738 || 8–5
|- align="center" bgcolor="ffbbbb"
| 14 || April 23 || Reds || 7–1 || Harang (2–2) || Zambrano (1–1) || || 40,039 || 8–6
|- align="center" bgcolor="ffbbbb"
| 15 || April 24 || @ Cardinals || 4–3 || McClellan (1–0) || Mármol (0–1) || Franklin (5) || 45,812 || 8–7
|- align="center" bgcolor="ffbbbb"
| 16 || April 25 || @ Cardinals || 8–2 || Boggs (1–0) || Marshall (0–1) || || 46,707 || 8–8
|- align="center" bgcolor="bbffbb"
| 17 || April 26 || @ Cardinals || 10–3 || Harden (2–1) || Wellemeyer (1–2) || || 44,742 || 9–8
|- align="center" bgcolor="ffbbbb"
| 18 || April 27 || @ Diamondbacks || 7–2 || Haren (2–3) || Lilly (2–2) || || 29,471 || 9–9
|- align="center" bgcolor="bbffbb"
| 19 || April 28 || @ Diamondbacks || 11–3 || Zambrano (2–1) || Petit (0–2) || || 30,351 || 10–9
|- align="center" bgcolor="ffbbbb"
| 20 || April 29 || @ Diamondbacks || 10–0 || Davis (2–3) || Dempster (1–1) || || 26,999 || 10–10
|- align="center" bgcolor="ffbbbb"
| 21 || April 30 || Marlins || 8 – 2 (10) || Pinto (2–0) || Heilman (2–1) || || 37,956 || 10–11
|-

|- bgcolor="ffbbbb"
|- align="center" bgcolor="bbffbb"
| 22 || May 1 || Marlins || 8–6 || Patton (1–1) || Badenhop (1–1) || Gregg (2) || 38,336 || 11–11
|- align="center" bgcolor="bbffbb"
| 23 || May 2 || Marlins || 6–1 || Lilly (3–2) || Sánchez (1–3) || || 40,083 || 12–11
|- align="center" bgcolor="bbffbb"
| 24 || May 3 || Marlins || 6–4 || Zambrano (3–1) || Nolasco (1–3) || Gregg (3) || 40,457 || 13–11
|- align="center" bgcolor="bbffbb"
| 25 || May 4 || Giants || 4–2 || Dempster (2–1) || Sánchez (1–2) || Gregg (4) || 39,112 || 14–11
|- align="center" bgcolor="ffbbbb"
| 26 || May 5 || Giants || 6–2 || Lincecum (3–1) || Marshall (0–2) || || 39,497 || 14–12
|- align="center" bgcolor="bbffbb"
| 27 || May 6 || @ Astros || 6–3 || Harden (3–1) || Hampton (1–3) || Gregg (5) || 29,415 || 15–12
|- align="center" bgcolor="bbffbb"
| 28 || May 7 || @ Astros || 8–5 || Lilly (4–2) || Ortiz (2–1) || || 28,625 || 16–12
|- align="center" bgcolor="ffbbbb"
| 29 || May 8 || @ Brewers || 3–2 || Stetter (2–0) || Heilman (2–2) || Hoffman (5) || 42,025 || 16–13
|- align="center" bgcolor="ffbbbb"
| 30 || May 9 || @ Brewers || 12–6 || Gallardo (4–1) || Dempster (2–2) || || 44,428 || 16–14
|- align="center" bgcolor="bbffbb"
| 31 || May 10 || @ Brewers || 4–2 || Marshall (1–2) || Suppan (2–3) || Gregg (6) || 41,646 || 17–14
|- align="center" bgcolor="bbffbb"
| 32 || May 12 || Padres || 6–2 || Harden (4–1) || Peavy (2–5) || || 39,963 || 18–14
|- align="center" bgcolor="bbffbb"
| 33 || May 13 || Padres || 6 – 4 (8) || Lilly (5–2) || Young (2–2) || Mármol (3) || 38,410 || 19–14
|- align="center" bgcolor="bbffbb"
| 34 || May 14 || Padres || 11–3 || Dempster (3–2) || Gaudin (0–3) || || 39,728 || 20–14
|- align="center" bgcolor="bbbbbb"
| || May 15 || Astros || colspan=6 | Postponed (rain) – rescheduled for July 30
|- align="center" bgcolor="bbffbb"
| 35 || May 16 || Astros || 5–4 || Marshall (2–2) || Hawkins (1–1) || || 40,549 || 21–14
|- align="center" bgcolor="ffbbbb"
| 36 || May 17 || Astros || 6–5 || Moehler (1–2) || Harden (4–2) || Sampson (1) || 40,478 || 21–15
|- align="center" bgcolor="ffbbbb"
| 37 || May 19 || @ Cardinals || 3–0 || Piñeiro (5–3) || Lilly (5–3) || || 41,374 || 21–16
|- align="center" bgcolor="ffbbbb"
| 38 || May 20 || @ Cardinals || 2–1 || Carpenter (2–0) || Dempster (3–3) || Franklin (10) || 41,703 || 21–17
|- align="center" bgcolor="ffbbbb"
| 39 || May 21 || @ Cardinals || 3–1 || Wainwright (4–2) || Marshall (2–3) || Franklin (11) || 44,235 || 21–18
|- align="center" bgcolor="ffbbbb"
| 40 || May 22 || @ Padres || 4–0 || Peavy (4–5) || Zambrano (3–2) || Bell (12) || 27,260 || 21–19
|- align="center" bgcolor="ffbbbb"
| 41 || May 23 || @ Padres || 3–1 || Geer (1–1) || Wells (0–1) || Mujica (1) || 37,798 || 21–20
|- align="center" bgcolor="ffbbbb"
| 42 || May 24 || @ Padres || 7–2 || Young (4–2) || Lilly (5–4) || || 39,593 || 21–21
|- align="center" bgcolor="ffbbbb"
| 43 || May 25 || Pirates || 10–8 || Gorzelanny (2–1) || Cotts (0–2) || Burnett (1) || 38,942 || 21–22
|- align="center" bgcolor="bbffbb"
| 44 || May 26 || Pirates || 6 – 1 (6) || Marshall (3–3) || Snell (1–6) || || 38,303 || 22–22
|- align="center" bgcolor="bbffbb"
| 45 || May 27 || Pirates || 5–2 || Mármol (1–1) || Chavez (0–2) || Gregg (7) || 38,314 || 23–22
|- align="center" bgcolor="ffbbbb"
| 46 || May 28 || Dodgers || 2–1 || Wolf (3–1) || Wells (0–2) || Troncoso (3) || 39,579 || 23–23
|- align="center" bgcolor="bbffbb"
| 47 || May 29 || Dodgers || 2–1 || Lilly (6–4) || Billingsley (6–3) || Gregg (8) || 40,148 || 24–23
|- align="center" bgcolor="bbffbb"
| 48 || May 30 || Dodgers || 7–0 || Dempster (4–3) || Stults (4–2) || || 41,153 || 25–23
|- align="center" bgcolor="ffbbbb"
| 49 || May 31 || Dodgers || 8–2 || Milton (2–0) || Marshall (3–4) || || 40,091 || 25–24
|-

|- bgcolor="ffbbbb"
|- align="center" bgcolor="ffbbbb"
| 50 || June 2 || @ Braves || 6 – 5 (12) || Soriano (1–0) || Heilman (2–3) || || 30,262 || 25–25
|- align="center" bgcolor="bbffbb"
| 51 || June 3 || @ Braves || 3 – 2 (11) || Guzmán (2–0) || Bennett (2–3) || Gregg (9) || 30,646 || 26–25
|- align="center" bgcolor="bbbbbb"
| || June 4 || @ Braves || colspan=6 | Postponed (rain) – rescheduled for June 22
|- align="center" bgcolor="bbffbb"
| 52 || June 5 || @ Reds || 2–1 || Zambrano (4–2) || Owings (3–7) || Gregg (10) || 32,374 || 27–25
|- align="center" bgcolor="ffbbbb"
| 53 || June 6 || @ Reds || 4 – 3 (11) || Masset (3–0) || Marshall (3–5) || || 40,914 || 27–26
|- align="center" bgcolor="bbffbb"
| 54 || June 7 || @ Reds || 6 – 3 (14) || Patton (2–1) || Lincoln (1–1) || Guzmán (1) || 32,629 || 28–26
|- align="center" bgcolor="bbffbb"
| 55 || June 9 || @ Astros || 7–1 || Lilly (7–4) || Moehler (2–4) || || 29,669 || 29–26
|- align="center" bgcolor="ffbbbb"
| 56 || June 10 || @ Astros || 2–1 || Sampson (3–0) || Guzmán (2–1) || || 29,840 || 29–27
|- align="center" bgcolor="ffbbbb"
| 57 || June 11 || @ Astros || 2 – 1 (13) || Fulchino (2–1) || Ascanio (0–1) || || 34,250 || 29–28
|- align="center" bgcolor="ffbbbb"
| 58 || June 12 || Twins || 7–4 || Slowey (9–2) || Wells (0–3) || Nathan (14) || 41,509 || 29–29
|- align="center" bgcolor="ffbbbb"
| 59 || June 13 || Twins || 2–0 || Swarzak (2–2) || Harden (4–3) || Nathan (15) || 40,899 || 29–30
|- align="center" bgcolor="bbffbb"
| 60 || June 14 || Twins || 3–2 || Mármol (2–1) || Crain (2–3) || || 40,814 || 30–30
|- align="center" bgcolor="bbbbbb"
| || June 16 || White Sox || colspan=6 | Postponed (rain) – rescheduled for September 3
|- align="center" bgcolor="ffbbbb"
| 61 || June 17 || White Sox || 4–1 || Danks (5–5) || Dempster (4–4) || Jenks (15) || 40,444 || 30–31
|- align="center" bgcolor="bbffbb"
| 62 || June 18 || White Sox || 6–5 || Gregg (1–1) || Thornton (4–2) || || 40,467 || 31–31 
|- align="center" bgcolor="bbffbb"
| 63 || June 19 || Indians || 8 – 7 (10) || Gregg (2–1) || Vizcaíno (1–3) || || 40,155 || 32–31 
|- align="center" bgcolor="bbffbb"
| 64 || June 20 || Indians || 6 – 5 (13) || Patton (3–1) || Wood (2–3) || || 41,007 || 33–31
|- align="center" bgcolor="bbffbb"
| 65 || June 21 || Indians || 6–2 || Wells (1–3) || Sowers (1–5) || Gregg (11) || 40,866 || 34–31
|- align="center" bgcolor="ffbbbb"
| 66 || June 22 || @ Braves || 0–2 || Vázquez (5–6) || Dempster (4–5) || Soriano (6) || 31,701 || 34–32
|- align="center" bgcolor="ffbbbb"
| 67 || June 23 || @ Tigers || 4–5 || Lyon (3–3) || Gregg (BS 3) (2–2) || || 38,046 || 34–33
|- align="center" bgcolor="ffbbbb"
| 68 || June 24 || @ Tigers || 3–5 || Miner (BS 2) (5–1) || Harden (4–4) || Rodney (15) || 36,438 || 34–34 
|- align="center" bgcolor="ffbbbb"
| 69 || June 25 || @ Tigers || 5–6 || Galarraga (4–7) || Lilly (7–5) || Rodney (16) || 42,332 || 34–35
|- align="center" bgcolor="bbffbb"
| 70 || June 26 || @ White Sox || 5–4 || Wells (2–3) || Contreras (2–7) || Gregg (12) || 39,015 || 35–35
|- align="center" bgcolor="ffbbbb"
| 71 || June 27 || @ White Sox || 7–8 || Jenks (2–2) || Marshall (3–6) || || 39,529 || 35–36
|- align="center" bgcolor="ffbbbb"
| 72 || June 28 || @ White Sox || 0–6 || Danks (6–6) || Zambrano (4–3) || || 39,745 || 35–37
|- align="center" bgcolor="bbffbb"
| 73 || June 29 || @ Pirates || 3–1 || Harden (5–4) || Duke || Gregg (13) || 15,400 || 36–37
|- align="center" bgcolor="ffbbbb"
| 74 || June 30 || @ Pirates || 0–3 || Ohlendorf (7–6) || Lilly (7–6) || Capps (18) || 17,054 || 36–38
|-

|- bgcolor="ffbbbb"
|- align="center" bgcolor="bbffbb"
| 75 || July 1 || @ Pirates || 4–1 || Wells (3–3) || Vasquez (1–1) || Gregg (14) || 15,770 || 37–38
|- align="center" bgcolor="bbffbb"
| 76 || July 2 || Brewers || 9–5 || Dempster (5–5) || McClung (3–2) || || 40,545 || 38–38
|- align="center" bgcolor="bbffbb"
| 77 || July 3 || Brewers || 2 – 1 (10) || Gregg (3–2) || DiFelice (4–1) || || 41,204 || 39–38
|- align="center" bgcolor="ffbbbb"
| 78 || July 4 || Brewers || 2–11 || Looper (7–4) || Harden (5–5) || || 40,088 || 39–39
|- align="center" bgcolor="bbffbb"
| 79 || July 5 || Brewers || 8–2 || Lilly (8–6) || Burns (1–2) || || 40,369 || 40–39
|- align="center" bgcolor="bbffbb"
| 80 || July 6 || Braves || 4–2 || Wells (4–3) || Jurrjens (6–7) || Gregg (15) || 40,042 || 41–39
|- align="center" bgcolor="ffbbbb"
| 81 || July 7 || Braves || 1–2 || Vázquez (6–7) || Zambrano (4–4) || Soriano (9) || 40,359 || 41–40
|- align="center" bgcolor="ffbbbb"
| 82 || July 8 || Braves || 1–4 || Kawakami (5–6) || Hart (0–1) || Soriano (10) || 40,531 || 41–41
|- align="center" bgcolor="ffbbbb"
| 83 || July 10 || Cardinals || 3–8 || Carpenter (7–3) || Harden (5–6) || || 40,687 || 41–42 
|- align="center" bgcolor="bbffbb"
| 84 || July 11 || Cardinals || 5–2 || Lilly (9–6) || Thompson (2–6) || Gregg (16) || 41,210 || 42–42
|- align="center" bgcolor="bbffbb"
| 85 || July 12 || Cardinals || 7–3 || Zambrano (5–4) || Lohse (4–5) || || 40,701 || 43–42
|- align="center" bgcolor="ffbbbb"
| 86 || July 12 || Cardinals || 2–4 || Wanwright (10–5) || Wells (4–4) || Franklin (21) || 41,244 || 43–43
|- align="center" bgcolor="bbffbb"
| 87 || July 16 || @ Nationals || 6–2 || Harden (6–6) || Lannan (6–7) || || 26,980 || 44–43
|- align="center" bgcolor="bbffbb"
| 88 || July 17 || @ Nationals || 3–1 || Zambrano (6–4) || Stammen (2–5) || Gregg (17) || 27,581 || 45–43
|- align="center" bgcolor="bbffbb"
| 89 || July 18 || @ Nationals || 6–5 || Wells (5–4) || Zimmermann (3–5) || Gregg (18) || 36,014 || 46–43
|- align="center" bgcolor="bbffbb"
| 90 || July 19 || @ Nationals || 11–3 || Hart (1–1) || Mock (0–3) || || 34,574 || 47–43
|- align="center" bgcolor="ffbbbb"
| 91 || July 20 || @ Phillies || 1–10 || Lopez (2–0) || Lilly (9–7) || Durbin (1) || 45,268 || 47–44
|- align="center" bgcolor="ffbbbb"
| 92 || July 21 || @ Phillies || 1–4 (13) || Condrey (6–2) || Samardzija (0–1) || || 45,214 || 47–45
|- align="center" bgcolor="bbffbb"
| 93 || July 22 || @ Phillies || 10–5 || Zambrano (7–4) || Moyer (9–7) || Gregg (19) || 45,257 || 48–45
|- align="center" bgcolor="bbffbb"
| 94 || July 24 || Reds || 8–5 || Wells (6–4) || Harang (5–11) || || 41,406 || 49–45
|- align="center" bgcolor="bbffbb"
| 95 || July 25 || Reds || 5–3 || Hart (2–1) || Cueto (8–7) || Gregg (20) || 41,364 || 50–45
|- align="center" bgcolor="bbffbb"
| 96 || July 26 || Reds || 5–2 || Harden (7–6) || Owings (6–11) || Gregg (21) || 41,528 || 51–45
|- align="center" bgcolor="bbffbb"
| 97 || July 27 || Astros || 5–1 (13) || Samardzija (1–1) || Sampson (4–2) || || 40,794 || 52–45
|- align="center" bgcolor="ffbbbb"
| 98 || July 28 || Astros || 6–11 || Fulchino (4–3) || Guzmán (2–2) || || 40,814 || 52–46
|- align="center" bgcolor="bbffbb"
| 99 || July 29 || Astros || 12–0 || Wells (7–4) || Hampton (6–8) || || 41,538 || 53–46
|- align="center" bgcolor="bbffbb"
| 100 || July 30 || Astros || 12–3 || Hart (3–1) || Ortiz (3–6) || || 41,524 || 54–46 
|- align="center" bgcolor="ffbbbb"
| 101 || July 31 || @ Marlins || 2–5 || Donnelly (1–0) || Mármol (2–2) || Núñez (9) || 25,024 || 54–47
|-

|- bgcolor="ffbbbb"
|- align="center" bgcolor="bbffbb"
| 102 || August 1 || @ Marlins || 9–8 (10) || Gregg (4–2) || Núñez (3–4) || Heilman (1) || 35,811 || 55–47
|- align="center" bgcolor="ffbbbb"
| 103 || August 2 || @ Marlins || 2–3 || Donnelly (2–0) || Gregg (4–3) || || 25,969 || 55–48 
|- align="center" bgcolor="bbffbb"
| 104 || August 3 || @ Reds || 4–2 || Wells (8–4) || Harang (5–13) || Mármol (4) || 22,222 || 56–48 
|- align="center" bgcolor="bbffbb"
| 105 || August 4 || @ Reds || 6–3 || Gorzelanny (4–1) || Cueto (8–9) || || 17,992 || 57–48
|- align="center" bgcolor="ffbbbb"
| 106 || August 5 || @ Reds || 0–4 || Lehr (1–0) || Harden (7–7) || || 22,098 || 57–49
|- align="center" bgcolor="ffbbbb"
| 107 || August 7 || @ Rockies || 2–6 || Jiménez (9–9) || Marshall (3–7) || || 46,118 || 57–50
|- align="center" bgcolor="bbffbb"
| 108 || August 8 || @ Rockies || 6–5 || Dempster (6–5) || Marquis (12–8) || Gregg (22) || 47,845 || 58–50
|- align="center" bgcolor="ffbbbb"
| 109 || August 9 || @ Rockies || 5–11|| Hammel (7–6) || Wells (8–5) || || 40,217 || 58–51
|- align="center" bgcolor="ffbbbb"
| 110 || August 10 || @ Rockies || 5–11 || de la Rosa (10–8) || Gorzelanny (4–2) || || 34,485 || 58–52
|- align="center" bgcolor="ffbbbb"
| 111 || August 11 || Phillies || 3–4 || Eyre (2–1) || Gregg (4–4) || Durbin (2) || 41,477 || 58–53
|- align="center" bgcolor="ffbbbb" 
| 112 || August 12 || Phillies || 5–12 || Martínez (1–0) || Samardzija (1–2) || || 41,133 || 58–54
|- align="center" bgcolor="ffbbbb"
| 113 || August 13 || Phillies || 1–6 || Lee (10–9) || Dempster (6–6) || || 41,100 || 58–55
|- align="center" bgcolor="bbffbb"
| 114 || August 14 || Pirates || 17–2 || Wells (9–5) || Morton (2–6) || || 41,619 || 59–55
|- align="center" bgcolor="bbffbb"
| 115 || August 15 || Pirates || 3–1 || Gorzelanny (5–2) || Duke (9–11) || Gregg (23) || 41,197 || 60–55
|- align="center" bgcolor="bbbbbb"
| || August 16 || Pirates || colspan=6 | Postponed (rain)
|- align="center" bgcolor="ffbbbb"
| 116 || August 17 || @ Padres || 1–4 || Bell (5–2) || Gregg (4–5) || || 23,420 || 60–56
|- align="center" bgcolor="ffbbbb"
| 117 || August 18 || @ Padres || 3–6 || Carrillo (1–1) || Dempster (6–7) || Bell (30) || 19,814 || 60–57
|- align="center" bgcolor="bbffbb"
| 118 || August 19 || @ Padres || 7–1 || Harden (8–7) || Latos (4–3) || || 18,012 || 61–57
|- align="center" bgcolor="ffbbbb"
| 119 || August 20 || @ Dodgers || 2–7 || Belisario (2–3) || Guzmán (2–3) || || 48,974 || 61–58
|- align="center" bgcolor="ffbbbb"
| 120 || August 21 || @ Dodgers || 1–2 || Wolf (8–6) || Wells (9–6) || Broxton (27) || 51,579 || 61–59
|- align="center" bgcolor="ffbbbb"
| 121 || August 22 || @ Dodgers || 0–2 || Haeger (1–1) || Lilly (9–8) || Sherrill (21) || 49,297 || 61–60
|- align="center" bgcolor="bbffbb"
| 122 || August 23 || @ Dodgers || 3–1 || Dempster (7–7) || Billingsley (12–7) || Mármol (5) || 49,711 || 62–60
|- align="center" bgcolor="ffbbbb"
| 123 || August 25 || Nationals || 6–15 || Mock (3–5) || Zambrano (7–5) || || 37,297 || 62–61
|- align="center" bgcolor="bbffbb"
| 124 || August 26 || Nationals || 9–4 || Guzmán (3–3) || Bergmann (2–3) || || 36,562 || 63–61
|- align="center" bgcolor="ffbbbb"
| 125 || August 27 || Nationals || 4–5 || Martin (3–3) || Wells (9–7) || MacDougal (14) || 35,174 || 63–62
|- align="center" bgcolor="bbffbb"
| 126 || August 28 || Mets || 5–2 || Gregg (5–5) || Stokes (1–3) || Mármol (6) || 39,381 || 64–62
|- align="center" bgcolor="bbffbb"
| 127 || August 29 || Mets || 11–4 || Dempster (8–7) || Parnell (3–7) || || 40,857 || 65–62 
|- align="center" bgcolor="ffbbbb"
| 128 || August 30 || Mets || 4–1 || Figueroa (1–3) || Zambrano (7–6) || Rodríguez (28) || 39,907 || 65–63
|- align="center" bgcolor="ffbbbb"
| 129 || August 31 || Astros || 5–3 || Oswalt (8–5) || Harden (8–8) || Valverde (20) || 36,990 || 65–64
|-

|- bgcolor="ffbbbb"
|- align="center" bgcolor="bbffbb"
| 130 || September 1 || Astros || 4–1 || Wells (10–7) || Moehler (8–10) || Mármol (7) || 36,332 || 66–64
|- align="center" bgcolor="bbffbb"
| 131 || September 2 || Astros || 2–0 || Lilly (10–8) || Paulino (2–7) || Mármol (8) || 39,192 || 67–64
|- align="center" bgcolor="ffbbbb"
| 132 || September 3 || White Sox || 0–5 || Torres (1–0) || Dempster (8–8) || || 40,741 || 67–65
|- align="center" bgcolor="ffbbbb"
| 133 || September 4 || @ Mets || 2–6 || Stokes (2–4) || Gregg (5–6) || Rodríguez (29) || 37,953 || 67–66
|- align="center" bgcolor="bbffbb"
| 134 || September 5 || @ Mets || 5–3 || Harden (9–8) || Figueroa (2–4) || Mármol (9) || 38,759 || 68–66
|- align="center" bgcolor="ffbbbb"
| 135 || September 6 || @ Mets || 2–4 || Pelfrey (10–10) || Wells (10–8) || Rodríguez (30) || 39,593 || 68–67
|- align="center" bgcolor="bbffbb"
| 136 || September 7 || @ Pirates || 4–2 || Lilly (11–8) || McCutchen (0–1) || Mármol (10) || 14,673 || 69–67
|- align="center" bgcolor="bbffbb"
| 137 || September 8 || @ Pirates || 9–4 || Dempster (9–8) || Duke (10–14) || || 17,862 || 70–67
|- align="center" bgcolor="bbffbb"
| 138 || September 9 || @ Pirates || 8–5 || Zambrano (8–6) || Hart (4–6) || Mármol (11) || 10,899 || 71–67
|- align="center" bgcolor="bbffbb"
| 139 || September 11 || Reds || 6–4 || Stevens (1–0) || Lehr (4–2) || Mármol (12) || 39,881 || 72–67
|- align="center" bgcolor="ffbbbb"
| 140 || September 12 || Reds || 5–7 || Rhodes (1–1) || Mármol (2–3) || Cordero (34) || 40,351 || 72–68
|- align="center" bgcolor="bbffbb"
| 141 || September 13 || Reds || 5–2 || Lilly (12–8) || Bailey (5–5) || || 39,805 || 73–68
|- align="center" bgcolor="bbffbb"
| 142 || September 14 || Brewers || 2–0 || Dempster (10–8) || Suppan (6–10) || Mármol (13) || 38,725 || 74–68
|- align="center" bgcolor="bbffbb"
| 143 || September 15 || Brewers || 13–7 || Heilman (3–3) || Gallardo (12–12) || || 38,986 || 75–68
|- align="center" bgcolor="ffbbbb"
| 144 || September 16 || Brewers || 5–9 || Looper (13–6) || Harden (9–9) || || 38,084 || 75–69
|- align="center" bgcolor="ffbbbb"
| 145 || September 17 || Brewers || 4–7 || Bush (5–7) || Wells (10–9) || Hoffman (33) || 39,158 || 75–70
|- align="center" bgcolor="ffbbbb"
| 146 || September 18 || @ Cardinals || 2–3 || Franklin (3–3) || Heilman (3–4) || || 45,959 || 75–71
|- align="center" bgcolor="ffbbbb"
| 147 || September 19 || @ Cardinals || 1–2 || Franklin (4–3) || Mármol (2–4) || || 46,506 || 75–72
|- align="center" bgcolor="bbffbb"
| 148 || September 20 || @ Cardinals || 6 – 3 (11) || Caridad (1–0) || Boggs (2–3) || Mármol (14) || 44,937 || 76–72
|- align="center" bgcolor="bbffbb"
| 149 || September 21 || @ Brewers || 10–2 || Gorzelanny (6–2) || Looper (13–7) || || 34,192 || 77–72
|- align="center" bgcolor="bbffbb"
| 150 || September 22 || @ Brewers || 7–2 || Wells (11–9) || Bush (5–8) || || 34,316 || 78–72
|- align="center" bgcolor="ffbbbb"
| 151 || September 23 || @ Brewers || 2–3 || Narveson (2–0) || Samardzija (1–3) || Hoffman (35) || 32,340 || 78–73
|- align="center" bgcolor="bbffbb"
| 152 || September 24 || @ Giants || 3–2 || Heilman (4–4) || Wilson (5–6) || Mármol (15) || 31,603 || 79–73
|- align="center" bgcolor="bbffbb"
| 153 || September 25 || @ Giants || 3–0 || Zambrano (9–6) || Lincecum (14–7) || || 33,970 || 80–73
|- align="center" bgcolor="bbffbb"
| 154 || September 26 || @ Giants || 6–2 || Gorzelanny (7–2) || Zito (10–13) || || 35,885 || 81–73
|- align="center" bgcolor="ffbbbb"
| 155 || September 27 || @ Giants || 1–5 || Cain (14–7) || Wells (11–10) || Wilson (37) || 38,330 || 81–74
|- align="center" bgcolor="bbffbb"
| 156 || September 29 || Pirates || 6–0 || Dempster (11–8) || Hart (4–9) || || 35,308 || 82–74 
|- align="center" bgcolor="ffbbbb"
| 157 || September 30 || Pirates || 0–4 || Morton (5–9) || Lilly (12–9) || || 34,362 || 82–75
|- align="center" bgcolor="ffbbbb"
| 158 || September 30 || Pirates || 2–8 || Karstens (4–5) || Zambrano (9–7) || || 33,299 || 82–76
|-

|- bgcolor="ffbbbb"
|- align="center" bgcolor="bbbbbb"
| 159 || October 1 || Pirates || colspan=6 | Canceled
|- align="center" bgcolor="ffbbbb"
| 160 || October 2 || Diamondbacks || 3–12 || Buckner (4–6) || Gorzelanny (7–3) || || 33,786 || 82–77
|- align="center" bgcolor="bbffbb"
| 161 || October 3 || Diamondbacks || 5–0 || Wells (12–10) || Cabrera (0–6) || || 39,138 || 83–77
|- align="center" bgcolor="ffbbbb"
| 162 || October 4 || Diamondbacks || 2–5 || Davis (9–14) || Dempster (11–9) || Gutiérrez (9) || 39,154 || 83–78
|-

Roster

Key injuries
The Cubs were plagued by injuries in 2009, and were only able to field their Opening Day starting lineup three times the entire season. Third baseman Aramis Ramírez injured his throwing shoulder in an early May game against the Milwaukee Brewers, sidelining him until early July and forcing journeyman players like Mike Fontenot and Aaron Miles into more prominent roles. Additionally, key players like Derrek Lee (back), Alfonso Soriano (legs and knee) and Geovany Soto (shoulder) nursed minor, nagging injuries.

Player stats

Batting

Starters by position
Note: Pos = Position; G = Games played; AB = At bats; H = Hits; Avg. = Batting average; HR = Home runs; RBI = Runs batted in

Other batters
Note: G = Games played; AB = At bats; H = Hits; Avg. = Batting average; HR = Home runs; RBI = Runs batted in

Pitching

Starting and other pitchers
Note: G = Games pitched; IP = Innings pitched; W = Wins; L = Losses; ERA = Earned run average; SO = Strikeouts; WHIP = Walks+hits per inning pitched

Relief pitchers
Note: G = Games pitched; W = Wins; L = Losses; SV = Saves; IP = Innings pitched; ERA = Earned run average; SO = Strikeouts; WHIP = Walks+hits per inning pitched

2008–2009 off-season

Trades

Free agent acquisitions

Players lost to free agency

Sale of the franchise
After many years of speculation that the Chicago Tribune wanted to sell the Chicago Cubs organization, they finally inked a deal on January 22, 2009 with the Ricketts family for a total of $900 million. The sale included the Cubs, Wrigley Field, and the Tribune's 25% stake in the Comcast Sports Network Chicago, a regional TV channel.

Media
Radio: Chicago Cubs Radio Network
The Chicago Cubs radio broadcasting team was anchored by veteran announcers Pat Hughes and Ron Santo this past season making it the duo's 15th year together. Hughes provides the play-by play-announcer while Santo serves as the color commentator.

TV: Comcast SportsNet Chicago, WGN-TV, WGN America, WCIU-TV
The Chicago Cubs 2009 television broadcasting team was anchored by Len Kasper and Bob Brenly. Games could be seen on multiple channels including: WGN-TV, Comcast SportsNet Chicago, WGN America, and even at times WCIU-TV.

Farm system

References

2009 Chicago Cubs season at Baseball Reference
2009 Chicago Cubs season Official Site (Archived 2009-06-20)

Chicago Cubs seasons
Chicago Cubs
Cub